Friedrich Koncilia (born 25 February 1948) is an Austrian former professional football who played as a goalkeeper.

Club career
Born in Klagenfurt, Koncilia made his debut for local side Austria Klagenfurt at 17, moving to SV Wattens in 1969. After two seasons there he enjoyed his longest and most successful spell at FC Wacker Innsbruck, staying there for eight years (teammates included his younger brother Peter, a midfielder). He moved abroad to R.S.C. Anderlecht of Belgium, only to return to Austria after a mere eight games and finished his career at Austria Wien. A back injury forced him to retire at 37.

International career
He made his debut for Austria in a September 1970 friendly match against Hungary and was a participant at the 1978 FIFA World Cup and at the 1982 FIFA World Cup. He earned 84 caps which makes him Austria's fifth most capped player of all-time (with Bruno Pezzey) His last international was a May 1985 World Cup qualification match against Cyprus.

Managerial statistics

Honours
FC Wacker Innsbruck
 Austrian Bundesliga: 1972, 1973, 1975, 1977
 Austrian Cup: 1973, 1975, 1978
 Mitropa Cup: 1975, 1976

Austria Wien
 Austrian Bundesliga: 1980, 1981, 1984, 1985
 Austrian Cup: 1980, 1982, 1984

References

External links
Profile - Austria Archive

1948 births
Living people
Sportspeople from Klagenfurt
Footballers from Carinthia (state)
Association football goalkeepers
Austrian footballers
Austrian expatriate footballers
Austria international footballers
1978 FIFA World Cup players
1982 FIFA World Cup players
FC Kärnten players
FC Wacker Innsbruck players
R.S.C. Anderlecht players
FK Austria Wien players
Austrian Football Bundesliga players
Expatriate footballers in Belgium
Belgian Pro League players
Austrian football managers
J1 League managers
Gamba Osaka managers
Expatriate football managers in Japan
FK Austria Wien managers
WSG Tirol players
Austrian expatriate sportspeople in Japan
Austrian expatriate sportspeople in Belgium